Roberto Fraile Fernández (1974 – 26 April 2021) was a Spanish journalist and cameraman.

Biography
Born in Barakaldo, he lived and worked in various media in Salamanca. He was a cameraman for Salamanca television since the 1990s and for some years he was also at La 8 de Salamanca.

He combined this work with filming armed conflicts. In 2012 he was injured by an explosion in Aleppo, where he was filming insurgent troops in the context of the Syrian civil war and was operated on in a hospital and evacuated to Turkey. During the last years of his life he made documentaries in Colombia and Brazil.

Murder
On 26 April 2021, Fraile was killed at the age of 46, alongside fellow Spanish journalist David Beriáin and Irish conservationist Rory Young, while they were filming a documentary about poaching in Pama, Burkina Faso. Their convoy was ambushed by Nusrat al-Islam, which then opened fire against them. He had two sons.

References 

1974 births
2021 deaths
21st-century Spanish journalists
21st-century Spanish writers
Assassinated Spanish journalists
Deaths by firearm in Burkina Faso
Male murder victims
People from Barakaldo
People murdered in Burkina Faso
Spanish journalists
Spanish male journalists
Spanish people murdered abroad
Spanish war correspondents